Welham or Wellham may refer to:

Places
Welham, Leicestershire, England
Welham, Nottinghamshire, England
Welham, Somerset, England; a UK location
Welham Boys' School, India
Welham Girls' School, India

People with the surname
Kris Welham (born 1987), English rugby league player
Tom Welham, British musician
Dirk Wellham (born 1959), Australian cricketer
Wally Wellham (born 1932), Australian cricketer